Southland Christian Church is an evangelical Christian church whose first campus is located in an unincorporated area of Jessamine County, Kentucky, which is just outside Lexington, Kentucky, United States. The church, which has a Nicholasville mailing address, is located at the corner of U.S. Route 68 (Harrodsburg Road) and Brannon Road.  The church has four additional campuses—one in Danville, one at the former site of Lexington Mall on Richmond Road in Lexington, one in Georgetown north of Lexington, and one in Richmond, KY which launched in 2020. It is associated with the Christian churches and churches of Christ. Its current Senior Pastor, Jon Weece, came to the church as a teaching pastor in 2000, and became Lead Follower in 2003.

Size and facility
Southland Christian Church is considered a megachurch. It is one of Kentucky's largest churches, averaging over 12,000 in attendance per weekend in 11 services—three in Nicholasville, two in Lexington, two at its Danville, Kentucky campus, two at its Georgetown, Kentucky campus, and two at its Richmond, Kentucky campus. The church also has a substantial ministry to the poor through its Helping Through Him ministry, including an on-site warehouse at the Nicholasville campus.

History
The church started in 1956 as a mission of Broadway Christian Church in Lexington. The founding pastor, Wayne Smith, came from Unity Christian Church (near Cynthiana, Kentucky), and held the first service with 172 people in attendance. The church was originally located on Hill 'N Dale Drive (near Southland Drive) in Lexington, Kentucky.   
In 1981, the church had grown substantially and relocated to a  site in neighboring Jessamine County.

The founding Senior Pastor, Wayne Smith, announced in 1995 that he would retire. At the time of his retirement, average church attendance was in the thousands.

In the midst of the search, Mike Breaux, pastor of Canyon Ridge Christian Church in Las Vegas, Nevada, was invited to preach as a guest. Afterwards, the search process was suspended and Mike Breaux was hired as Senior Pastor, becoming the church's second. During his tenure the church grew to an attendance of more than 7,000 persons a week. Jon Weece joined Southland as a teaching pastor in 2000, sharing in the responsibilities of a church with six weekend services.  After a building program that reduced the weekend services from six to five, Breaux moved to Willow Creek Community Church in South Barrington, Illinois, in 2003.

Weece, a former missionary to Haiti, became the third senior pastor on September 1, 2003. Still in his twenties at the time, he was one of the youngest megachurch senior pastors in the United States.

In 2009, Southland opened its first satellite campus in Danville, KY.  An additional satellite campus is planned for the former Lexington Mall site on Richmond Road in Lexington.

In 2010, Southland purchased the former Lexington Mall to begin construction on a new "Richmond Road" campus.  The campus opened in January 2013.

In 2015, Southland began holding services in Georgetown, KY at Lemons Mill Elementary.

In 2018, Southland announced a launch of a new campus in Richmond, KY in 2020.

Locations
Adopting a "single church in multiple locations" strategy, sermons are preached at one primary location, the Nicholasville Campus at 5001 Harrodsburg Rd, Nicholasville KY, 40356, and streamed to the remaining 4 satellite campuses:

 Danville Campus - 1001 Ben Ali Dr. #2, Danville, KY 40422
 Georgetown Campus - 134 Amerson Way, Georgetown, KY 40324
 Lexington Campus - 2349 Richmond Rd, Lexington, KY 40502
 Richmond Campus - 1432 Fairlane Dr, Richmond, KY 40475 (Services held at Madison Central High School - 705 N 2nd St. Richmond, KY 40475)

Beliefs
As a Restoration Movement church, Southland's beliefs are similar to other churches' in the movement, although local congregations are independent and may vary slightly from each other. Southland members include a large number of people with roots in denominations outside the Restoration Movement, including a significant number from Baptist and Wesleyan/Methodist traditions among others. As such, the church also has strong influences from, and often even identifies itself with, Protestantism.

Southland's mission statement is that they are courageous followers of Jesus who love God and love people in their communities, in their city, and in the world. Southland is a church of people who believe the best way to live life is with Jesus, in community, and on mission.

The church furthermore believes that marriage is a "a life-long relationship between a man and a woman."

Southlandonline.tv
Southland's services can be viewed live online at https://southland.church/online every Sunday at 10:00 as well as on ABC 36 at the same time. The television broadcast can be accessed throughout the East Central Kentucky Region.

See also
List of megachurches

References

External links
 Southland Christian Church Website

Churches in Boyle County, Kentucky
Churches in Jessamine County, Kentucky
Churches in Lexington, Kentucky
Christian churches and churches of Christ
Evangelical churches in Kentucky
Evangelical megachurches in the United States
Culture of Lexington, Kentucky
U.S. Route 68
1956 establishments in Kentucky
2009 establishments in Kentucky
2013 establishments in Kentucky
Megachurches in Kentucky